The Heisler locomotive is one of the three major types of geared steam locomotives and the last to be patented.

Charles L. Heisler received a patent for the design in 1892, following the construction of a prototype in 1891. Somewhat similar to a Climax locomotive, Heisler's design featured two cylinders canted inwards at a 45-degree angle to form a 'V-twin' arrangement. Power then went to a longitudinal drive shaft in the center of the frame that drove the outboard axle on each powered truck through bevel gears in an enclosed gearcase riding on the axle between the truck frames. The inboard axle on each truck was then driven from the outboard one by external side (connecting) rods.

In 1897, Heisler received a patent on a three-truck locomotive.  As with Class C Shay locomotives, the tender rode on the third truck.  Unlike the Shay, Heisler's design did not have a continuous string of line shafting running the length of the engine.  Instead, the tender truck was driven by a line shaft above the shaft driving the main engine trucks, connected to it through spur gears.  This patent also covered use of a 4-cylinder 'vee four' cylinder configuration.

The Heisler was the fastest of the geared steam locomotive designs, and yet was still claimed by its manufacturer to have the same low-speed hauling ability.

Builders
The first Heislers were built by the Dunkirk Engineering Company of Dunkirk, New York, at the time producer of their own design of geared locomotive (called the Dunkirk), of which the Heisler could be considered an improvement.  They did not adopt the Heisler design, but in 1894 the Stearns Manufacturing Company of Erie, Pennsylvania started to produce Heislers, and did so until 1904.  Reorganised as the Heisler Locomotive Works in 1907, it produced locomotives of the Heisler design until 1941.

A & G Price of Thames, New Zealand received an order for a Heisler locomotive in 1943 from Ogilvie and Co, sawmillers of Hokitika, who wanted to purchase a Heisler locomotive but were unable to do so as production of Heisler locomotives had ceased in 1941.  The resulting locomotive, maker's NO 148 of 1944, was the last Heisler-design steam locomotive to be built, and closely followed Heisler practice but with the addition of a Belpaire firebox and front-mounted water tanks that featured a unique curved leading edge.

Variants
There was one single-truck, narrow gauge Heisler built, Lake Shore Stone Products Co. #7 for the Lake Shore Stone Products Co.Lake Shore Stone Co., Milwaukee, Wisconsin?

Notable survivors
Roughly 625 Heislers were produced, of which some 35 still exist. Approximately eight of these survivors are currently operational.

Advantages and disadvantages
The Heisler locomotive's gearing was inside the frame and thus protected, unlike that of a Shay locomotive. However, the Heisler's drive shaft, which was located in the center of the frame, limited firebox space. For this reason, when A & G Price built their Heisler, in 1943, they used a Belpaire firebox, to mitigate problems with burning wood and accommodating the drive shaft.

References

Further reading
 Anonymous, The Heisler Locomotive, 1891-1941, published by Benjamin F. G. Kline, Jr., 1982.

External links

Geared Steam Locomotive Works' Heisler pages
Locomotives Built by Heisler Locomotive Works
Heisler locomotive at Travel Town museum
Nelson Riedel's Heisler Locomotive page

Geared steam locomotives
Articulated locomotives
Freight locomotives